Verkhni Synivtsi is a village in Chernivtsi Raion, Chernivtsi Oblast, Ukraine. It is composed of two villages, Verkhni Synivtsi and Nyzhni Synivtsi (Нижні Синівці; Sinăuții de Jos). It belongs to Terebleche rural hromada, one of the hromadas of Ukraine.

Until 18 July 2020, Verkhni Synivtsi belonged to Hlyboka Raion. The raion was abolished in July 2020 as part of the administrative reform of Ukraine, which reduced the number of raions of Chernivtsi Oblast to three. The area of Hlyboka Raion was merged into Chernivtsi Raion.

Notable people 
 Vasile Tărâțeanu

References

Villages in Chernivtsi Raion